TexCare is a program developed by the State of Texas to raise awareness of the children's health insurance options available, and to help Texas families obtain and use affordable coverage for their uninsured children (ages 0–19). The Texas Health and Human Services Commission operates the program.

Offerings 

TexCare offers two separate children's health insurance programs with benefits packages that cover a full range of services including regular checkups, immunizations, prescription drugs, lab tests, X-rays, hospital visits, and more.

External links

 CHIP & Children's Medicaid Web site
 TexCare Web site (Archive)

Medical and health organizations based in Texas
Medicare and Medicaid (United States)